Mishima High School may refer to:

Mishima High School, Ehime, Japan
Mishima High School (Osaka Prefecture), Japan, operated by the Osaka Prefectural Board of Education
Mishima High School (Nippon University), a high school belonging to Nippon University, located in Shizuoka, Japan
Mishima Polytechnical School, a fictional high school that appears in the Tekken series of video games